North Huddersfield Trust School (formerly Fartown High School) is a coeducational secondary school located in the Fartown area of Huddersfield, West Yorkshire, England.

Previously a community school administered by Kirklees Metropolitan Borough Council, in September 2011 Fartown High School was formally closed and replaced with North Huddersfield Trust School on the same site. The school is now administered by North Huddersfield Trust. The Trust's lead educational partner is Holmfirth High School. The other partners are Kirklees College, the University of Huddersfield and Kirklees Metropolitan Borough Council.

North Huddersfield Trust School offers GCSEs and BTECs as programmes of study for pupils, as well as some vocational courses offered in conjunction with Kirklees College. The school also has an adult education provision for the local community.

References

External links
North Huddersfield Trust School official website

Secondary schools in Kirklees
Schools in Huddersfield
Foundation schools in Kirklees